Loxomerus is a genus of ground beetles in the family Carabidae. There are four described species in Loxomerus, found in New Zealand.

Species
These four species belong to the genus Loxomerus:
 Loxomerus brevis (Blanchard, 1843)
 Loxomerus huttoni (Broun in Hutton & Broun, 1902)
 Loxomerus katote Johns, 2010
 Loxomerus nebrioides (Guérin-Méneville, 1841)

References

Migadopinae